Hlukhiv is a small historic town on the Esman River. It belongs to Shostka Raion of Sumy Oblast of Ukraine. Population: 

It is known for being a capital of the Cossack Hetmanate after deposition of Ivan Mazepa in 1708–1764. The former Soviet Chervone-Pustohorod air base is located near Hlukhiv.

History 

First noticed by chroniclers as a Severian town in 1152. Sometime in 1247 Hlukhiv became the seat of a branch of the princely house of Chernigov following the Mongol invasion of Rus. Between 1320 and 1503 it was part of the Grand Duchy of Lithuania before being conquered by the Grand Duchy of Moscow. In 1618 it became part of the Polish–Lithuanian Commonwealth (in the Czernihów Voivodeship of the Crown of Poland) and was granted Magdeburg Rights in 1644 by Władysław IV Vasa. In 1648–1764 it was part of the Cossack Hetmanate within the Nizhyn Regiment (province).

In 1654 the Cossack Hetmanate came under military protectorate of the Tsardom of Muscovy in accordance with the Treaty of Pereyaslav and in 1664, during the siege of Hlukhiv, the Russo-Cossack garrison of the town successfully defended against a superiour Polish army which suffered great losses during the following retreat. According to the Truce of Andrusovo along with the rest Left-bank Ukraine it was ceded to the Tsardom of Muscovy in 1667.

In 1708 after realizing that Ivan Mazepa sided with Carl XII, Peter the Great order to destroy Baturyn and transfer capital to Hlukhiv. Here in November 1708 was elected a new Hetman of Zaporizhian Host Ivan Skoropadsky, while the Metropolitan of Kyiv, Halych and all Little Russia Ioasaf was forced to proclaim anathema onto Mazepa in the St. Trinity Cathedral (destroyed in 1962). Hlukhiv served as the capital of the Cossack Hetmanate in 1708-64 and until 1773 the administrative center of the Little Russia Governorate. Under the last hetmans of Ukraine, the town was remodeled in the Baroque style. Subsequently, it declined in consequence of frequent fires, so that very few of its architectural gems survived.

Since the first school of singing in the Russian Empire was established there in 1738, the town has a rich musical heritage. Composers Dmytro Bortniansky and Maksym Berezovsky, whose statues grace the Bortniansky Square of Hlukhiv, are believed to have studied there.

In 1874 in a college was established in Hlukhiv (today Hlukhiv National Pedagogical University of Oleksandr Dovzhenko). In 1879, the Tereshchenko brothers, who were Russian millionaires of Ukrainian descent, established a free hospital of St. Euphrosyne and supported it financially. In 1899 on the funds of Tereshchenko family in Hlukhiv was established another college (today Agrarian college of the Sumy Agrarian University).

In 1918 the city became part of Ukraine, however already in January 1918 it was occupied by the Soviet troops for several months. The Soviet regime returned again to the city a year later in 1919.

During World War II, Hlukhiv was occupied by the German Army from 9 September 1941 to 30 August 1943.

In 1994 in the city was established the State Historical and Cultural Heritage Park.

In October 2015 at the local election, the mayor of the city became , a naturalized Ukrainian from France and great grandson of Mikhail Tereshchenko. Tereshchenko stepped down as mayor in October 2018 with the intention to become a candidate in the 2019 Ukrainian presidential election. Yet, during the November–December 30 days martial law in Ukraine he resumed his position as mayor and on 3 January 2019 he declared his support for (another) presidential candidate Andriy Sadovyi during a congress of Sadovyi's party Self Reliance.

2022 Russian Invasion 
Clashes have been ongoing in Hlukhiv between the Ukrainian Armed Forces and the invading Russian Armed Forces in the city and its surrounding areas since 24 February, 2022.

On March 2, 2022, Hlukhiv was liberated from Russian occupation.

Demographics

Sights 
The oldest building in the town is the church of St. Nicholas (1693), modeled after traditional wooden churches and executed in the Ukrainian Baroque style. The church, repaired and renovated in 1871, has three pear-shaped domes and a two-storey bell tower.

The church of the Savior's Transfiguration (1765) straddles the line between Baroque and Neoclassicism, while the massive Neo-Byzantine cathedral (1884–93) resembles St Volodymyr's Cathedral in Kyiv.

Probably the best known landmark of modern Hlukhiv is the conspicuous water tower (1927–29), though more historical interest attaches to the triumphal arch, dated either to 1744 or 1766. It has been suggested that the architect of this rather plain structure was Andrey Kvasov. The arch, the oldest in Ukraine, sustained damage during World War II but was subsequently restored.

Religion 
Most dominant religious presentation in the city has the Russian Orthodox Church through the Ukrainian Orthodox Church (Moscow Patriarchate).

Near Hlukhiv in the village of Sosnivka is located a small monastery (Russian Orthodox Church) Glinsk Hermitage.

Agricultural research 
Due to the traditional cultivation of industrial hemp in the area, Hlukhiv has become home to the Institute of Bast Crops of the Ukrainian Academy of Agrarian Sciences, working on breeding improved hemp and flax cultivars. In the 1970s, the institute developed low-THC hemp varieties for industrial cultivation.

Gallery

See also
 Tereshchenko family
 Tereshchenko churches

References

External links
  Encyclopedia of Ukraine: Hlukhiv
  "Glukhivtower" -  About Glukhiv businesses and community.
  Unofficial information site about Hlukhiv

Cities in Sumy Oblast
Glukhovsky Uyezd
Chernihiv Voivodeship
Former capitals of Ukraine
Cities of regional significance in Ukraine
Cossack Hetmanate